Medd is a surname. Notable people with the surname include:

Bruce Medd (born 1953), Canadian gymnast and Olympics competitor
Donald Gordon Medd Nelson (1914–1989), Canadian surgeon general and air force medical officer
Gordon Medd (1925–1996), English footballer
Henry Medd (1892–1977), British architect
Mary Medd (1907–2005), British architect
Pete Medd (born 1976), American football player and coach
Peter Medd (1829–1908), English priest and scholar
William George Medd (1869–1951), Canadian businessman and politician